Piesendorf is a municipality in the district of Zell am See (Pinzgau region), in the state of Salzburg in Austria. It lies in the Kitzbühel Alps between Kitzbühel and Zell am See. Due to its location between the ski resorts of Zell am See, Kitzbühel and the Hohe Tauern National park with Austria's highest mountains, it has become centered on tourism. Piesendorf lies directly across from the Kitzsteinhorn and the Großglockner, the latter being Austria's talles peak.

Population
Piesendorf has been growing at a fast rate since the 1900s, surpassing some of its neighboring towns in population.

Places of Interest 

 Walchen castle
 St. Laurentius Church, built in the town center in the 14th century.
 Walchen Church, built in the 13th century.
 St. Leonhard Church, built in 1716.
 Golfclub Zell am See-Kaprun-Saalbach, split between the municipalities of Piesendorf and Zell am See.

Transportation 
The Pinzgauer Lokalbahn local rail service connects Piesendorf to Zell am See. The town is served by multiple public and private bus lines.

Personalities 
Alfred Eder (b. 1953), biathlete

References

Cities and towns in Zell am See District